Superbike racing is a category of motorcycle racing that employs highly modified production motorcycles, as opposed to MotoGP in which purpose-built motorcycles are used. The Superbike World Championship is the official world championship series, though national Superbike championships are held in many countries, including the United Kingdom, the United States, Japan, Australia and Canada. Superbike racing is generally popular with manufacturers, since it helps promote and sell their product, as captured by the slogan "Win on Sunday; Sell on Monday".

Characteristics of Superbike racing motorcycles
Superbike racing motorcycles are derived from standard production models, so for a bike to be eligible, the manufacturer must first homologate the model and manufacture the required number of roadgoing machines. While rules vary from series to series, in general the motorcycles must maintain the same profile as their roadgoing counterparts, with the same overall appearance as seen from the front, rear and sides. In addition, the frame cannot be modified. Teams may modify some elements of the bike, including the suspensions, brakes, swingarm, and the diameter and size of the wheels.

Superbike racing motorcycles must have four-stroke engines of between 850 cc and 1200 cc for twins, and between 750 cc and 1000 cc for four cylinder machines.

The restriction to production models distinguishes Superbike racing from MotoGP racing, which uses prototype machines that bear little resemblance to production machines. This is somewhat similar to the distinction in car racing between sports cars and Formula One cars, though the performance gap between Superbike and MotoGP racing is much smaller.

The world's first 'Superbike' was built by brothers Ross and Ralph Hannan in the mid/late 1970s. First ridden successfully in Australia and overseas, including the Suzuka 8 hour and the Bol d'Or 24-hour endurance races, by Graeme Crosby who went on to international success and was eventually inducted into the NZ sports "Hall of Fame".

Superbike World Championship

Superbike World Championship (also known as SBK) is the premier international superbike Championship. The championship was founded in 1988. It is regulated by the FIM and managed and promoted by FGSport.

Once regarded as the poor cousin to the more glamorous MotoGP championship, the Superbike World Championship has grown into a world-class professional racing series. Many of the riders that competed in SBK over the years are household names among motorcycle racing fans. The most successful rider thus far has been Northern Irelands Jonathan Rea, who won the championship six times (2015, 2016, 2017, 2018, 2019, 2020). Ducati has been the most successful manufacturer in the series over the years, accumulating 15 manufacturer championships. Honda has won it 6 times, with Suzuki claiming one championship. Australia's Troy Bayliss won the 2006 and 2008 titles riding for Xerox Ducati and James Toseland, from the UK, was the winner of the 2007 championship riding for Hannspree Ten Kate Honda.

National Superbike series
National Superbike series vary greatly in challenge and popularity, the most popular being in Britain and North America. Both Japan and Australia have well supported national superbikes series, though they only run for short, 10-race seasons.

British Superbike Championship

The British Superbike championship (known to most as "BSB") is the leading motorcycle racing championship in the United Kingdom. It is managed and organised by MCRCB-Events. The commercial and television rights have been delegated to MotorSport Vision. Ducati, Kawasaki, Suzuki and Yamaha all have well supported teams, while Honda has the only HRC supported superbike team outside Japan. Japanese rider Ryuichi Kiyonari won the 2006, 2007 and 2010 titles riding for HM Plant Honda.

MotoAmerica Superbike Championship (previously AMA Superbike Championship) 
Beginning in 2015 the US National Superbike championship moved to a new organization, MotoAmerica, after several years of decline. The new championship is known as the MotoAmerica Superbike Championship, and incorporates classes similar to those operating at world championship level, and other national series,  i.e. Superbike, Supersport, Superstock 1000, Superstock and KTM Junior cup. . The aim of the new championship is to reinvigorate motorcycle road racing in North America and ultimately send its riders to the top-level international championships - MotoGP and World Superbike.

The AMA Superbike was the premier superbike racing series in the United States. It was part of the AMA Pro Racing series, and was managed by the AMA until 2009 when the AMA sold the series to the Daytona MotorSports Group. The series was replaced in 2015 by the MotoAmerica Superbike championship.

All Japan Superbike Championship

The All Japan Road Race Championship, also known as MFJ Superbike is the premiere motorcycle road racing championship in Japan and is run by MFJ. The championship started in 1967 and has been running a superbike class since 1994. The series runs a small 7 round schedule but has a large field of Japanese riders and bikes. Atsushi Watanabe won the 2007 championship riding a Yoshimura Suzuki.

Mopar Canadian Superbike Championship

The Mopar Canadian Superbike Championship is the Canadian national Superbike series. The series runs from May to September and consists of six to eight rounds per season. Riders from the Canadian series often compete in AMA Superbike during the Canadian off-season. Jordan Szoke won his 8th title in 2012, riding a BMW S1000RR.

Nigeria Superbike Road Race

The Nigeria Superbike Road Race, The Bikers Trophy (The BT) is held annually on the last weekend in November, in Edo State, Nigeria. It is the premier motorcycling sports event in Nigeria and West Africa with participants and spectators from all over the World. Modelled after the Isle of Man TT races, The Bikers Trophy (The BT) races take place in a time trial format over a 32 km street circuits which traverse the 8 communities of Urhonigbe, Urohmehe, Umughun, Ogba, Evbonogbon, Ugo, Ekpokor, and Ugbokirima in Orhiomwon Local Government Area of Edo State.

The 2014 event saw podium places go to Jack Affara (Champion), Armstrong Ngugu (2nd Position) and Ikhide Izokpu (3rd Position). Other countries with road races are the Netherlands, Spain, Belgium, Germany, Great Britain, the Czech Republic, Turkey, Ukraine, New Zealand and Macau.

Other Series
 Moto 1000 GP (Brazilian national championship)
 Irish Road Racing Championship (Irish national championship on closed roads)
 Australian Superbike Championship (Australian national championship)
 Championnat de France Superbike (French national championship)
 China Superbike Championship (Chinese national championship)
 Campeonato Español de Velocidad (Spanish national championship)
 CIV Superbike (Italian national championship)
 IDM Superbike (German national championship)
 CitiBike Motorcycle Championship (South Africa)
 New Zealand Road Race Championship
 Dutch Superbike Kampioenschap
 Philippines Superbike Championship
 International Road Racing Championship (IRRC)

Defunct series
 750cc Superbike European Championship
 Austrian Superbike Championship
 Swiss Superbike Championship

See also
 Outline of motorcycles and motorcycling
 Isle of Man TT

References

External links
 List of Superbike champions, including for national series

 
Motorsport categories in Australia